Brink is an unincorporated community in Greensville County, Virginia, United States. Brink is located within the vicinity of the intersections of Virginia Secondary Routes 627 and 633 southwest of the city of Emporia.

References

Unincorporated communities in Greensville County, Virginia
Unincorporated communities in Virginia